Siah Kola or Siyah Kala or Siah Kala or Seyah Kala may refer to:
 Siah Kola, Mahmudabad
 Siah Kola, Nur